Shark River Slough (SRS) is a low-lying area of land that channels water through the Florida Everglades, beginning in Water Conservation Area 3, flowing through Everglades National Park, and ultimately into Florida Bay.  Together with Taylor Slough to the east, Shark River Slough is an essential conduit of overland freshwater to Florida Bay.  Shark River Slough is also known as the "River of Grass."

Description
Shark River Slough is the dominant path for flow of water into Everglades National Park.  SRS is a mixture of sawgrass marshes, tree islands, sloughs, and wet prairies.  The SRS is bordered by marl prairies.

Everglades restoration
Historically, Shark River Slough was the primary path for water flow in the Everglades system.   Restoration of the historic function of the slough is essential to restoration of Everglades National Park.

Tidal influence
Shark River Slough has tides from the Gulf of Mexico that reach 30 km inland.

See also
 Taylor Slough
 Cape Sable Seaside Sparrow
 Everglades
 Everglades National Park

References

Everglades